E3 ubiquitin-protein ligase CHFR is an enzyme that in humans is encoded by the CHFR gene.

CHFR is recruited to sites of DNA damage and participates in the DNA damage response.  CHFR has an important role in the survival of male premeiotic germ cells.  About 30% of male CHFR knockout mice are infertile.  In these knockout mice spermatogenesis onset is delayed and apoptosis in premeiotic germ cells is significantly increased.  When these mice are 3 months old there is a complete loss of germ cells in their testes.

References

External links

Further reading